Amberg may refer to the following places:

Germany
 Amberg, Upper Palatinate, Bavaria, Germany
 Amberg, Swabia, Bavaria, Germany
Amberg (electoral district)

United States
 Amberg, Wisconsin, a town in Wisconsin
 Amberg (community), Wisconsin, an unincorporated community in the Wisconsin town

See also 
 Amberg (name)